Hector Og Maclean, or Eachann Óg Maclean in Gaelic may refer to:
Hector Og Maclean, 13th Chief (c. 1540-1573), 13th Chief of Clan MacLean in Scotland
Sir Hector Og Maclean, 15th Chief (1583–1623), 15th Clan Chief of Clan Maclean in Scotland and 5th Laird of Dowart
Hector Og Maclean of Brolas, son of Donald Maclean, 1st Laird of Brolas